Our Fires Still Burn is a one-hour documentary produced by Audrey Geyer that explores the experiences of contemporary Native Americans through a compilation of first-person narratives ranging from midwestern Native Americans in "Indian boarding schools" where children were forced for assimilation. The documentary depicts the personal stories of Native American role models from all walks of life, including a successful businessman, journalist, artist, and youth advocate, as well as tribal and spiritual leaders. The documentary still continues to be run by the Public Broadcast System (PBS).

Response 
The Tribal College Review’s Ryan Winn called the film "part historical record, part rallying cry" and said that "the film's potency derives from those stories in which years of adversity have given way to times of cultural pride and preservation." Constance Bailey of the Journal of American Folklore said, "Geyer masterfully frames the relationship between language and culture that she weaves throughout the production."

References 

American documentary television films
Documentary films about Native Americans
PBS original programming
Native American topics
Assimilation of indigenous peoples of North America
Boarding schools
Native American boarding schools
United States federal Indian policy
Native American genocide
2010s American films